Rahmat Shah Zurmatai (born 6 July 1993) is an Afghan cricketer who plays for the Afghanistan national cricket team. He is a right-handed batsman who is an occasional leg break bowler. He made his international debut for Afghanistan in March 2013. He was one of the eleven cricketers to play in Afghanistan's first ever Test match, against India, in June 2018. In September 2019, in the one-off Test between Afghanistan and Bangladesh, Rahmat became the first batsman for Afghanistan to score a century in Test cricket.

Domestic career
Rahmat was named in a number of first-class and One-Day International squads for Afghanistan. He has played List A cricket for Afghanistan against Pakistan A and other domestic teams like Faisalabad and Rawalpindi. He made his Twenty20 debut for Band-e-Amir Dragons in the 2017 Shpageeza Cricket League on 12 September 2017.

In July 2018, Rahmat was the leading run-scorer for Mis Ainak Region in the 2018 Ghazi Amanullah Khan Regional One Day Tournament, with 258 runs in five matches. He was also the leading wicket-taker for the team in the tournament, with eight dismissals in five matches.

International career
Rahmat made his One Day International (ODI) debut for Afghanistan against Scotland on 6 March 2013. On 4 July 2016, he made his first century in an ODI during Afghanistan's tour of Scotland.

In May 2018, Rahmat was named in Afghanistan's squad for their inaugural Test match, played against India. He made his Test debut for Afghanistan, against India, on 14 June 2018. In February 2019, he was named in Afghanistan's Test squad for their one-off match against Ireland in India.

In April 2019, Rahmat was named in Afghanistan's squad for the 2019 Cricket World Cup. He finished the tournament as the leading run-scorer for Afghanistan, with 254 runs in nine matches.

In April 2019, the Afghanistan Cricket Board (ACB) named Shah as the team's new Test captain, replacing Asghar Afghan. However, following the 2019 Cricket World Cup, Rashid Khan was named as the new captain of the Afghanistan cricket team across all three formats. Therefore, Rahmat was replaced before captaining the team in a Test match.

In September 2019, Rahmat scored a century in the one-off Test match against Bangladesh, becoming the first batsman for Afghanistan to score a century in a Test match.

T20 franchise career
In September 2018, Rahmat was named in Nangarhar's squad in the first edition of the Afghanistan Premier League tournament.

References

External links
 

1993 births
Living people
Afghan cricketers
Afghanistan Test cricketers
Afghanistan One Day International cricketers
People from Paktia Province
Afghan Cheetahs cricketers
Mohammedan Sporting Club cricketers
Mis Ainak Knights cricketers
Nangarhar Leopards cricketers
Cricketers at the 2019 Cricket World Cup